The Cracău is a left tributary of the river Bistrița in Romania. It is formed at the confluence of its headwaters Cracăul Alb and Cracăul Negru in Magazia. It discharges into the Bistrița in Roznov.

Tributaries

The following rivers are tributaries to the river Cracău (from source to mouth):

Left: Cracăul Alb, Burloaia, Zahorna, Bahna
Right: Cracăul Negru, Purcăroaia, Burdaleuca, Almaș

References

External links
 Tourist map, Parcul Vânători-Neamț

Rivers of Romania
Rivers of Neamț County